Results for Development (R4D) is a global nonprofit strategy consulting organization."

Regions and countries
Results for Development is active in more than 55 countries.

History
Founded in 2008 by David de Ferranti, who served with the World Bank and various international foundations, including the Rockefeller Foundation. De Ferranti worked at RAND Corporation and was a senior fellow at the Brookings Institution. He holds a doctorate in economics from Princeton University and a bachelor of arts from Yale College.

Leadership

Board of directors 
Current members of the board include Ngozi Okonjo-Iweala (Former Minister of Finance and Economy of Nigeria), Jorge Quiroga, (Former President of Bolivia), Julio Frenk (President of the University of Miami), Roberto Danino (Former Prime Minister of Peru), Doug Hattaway (President/CEO of Hattaway Communications), Ozgur Karaosmanoglu (SVP of Raymond James & Associates), Dzingai Mutumbuka (Chair of the Association for the Development of Education in Africa), Mark W. Hinkley (Former Executive Vice President of OdysseyRe), and former R4D President David de Ferranti, who chairs the board.

Leadership
The leadership team at R4D includes President and CEO Gina Lagomarsino, Executive Vice President Marty Makinen, Executive Vice President Nathaniel Heller, Chief Financial Officer Quoc Nguyen, Chief Communications Officer Heather Luca, Chief People Officer Ryan Noll and Managing Director Augustin Flory.

References

Development charities based in the United States